CHWK-FM is a Canadian radio station that broadcasts a country format at 89.5 FM in Chilliwack, British Columbia. The station is branded as 89.5 JR Country.

Owned by Jim Pattison Broadcast Group, the station was licensed to Fabmar Communications in May, 2008. The station began testing on February 11, 2009 and launched at 12:05 pm on February 20, 2009, as 89.5 The Hawk, Chilliwack's Rock Station, initially playing an active rock format, later adopting a more classic rock format. The station was also the radio home of the WHL Chilliwack Bruins from February 2009 until the team's relocation to Victoria following the 2011 season.

Glen Slingerland and Sadie are the 'Breakfast Club' 5:30am-10am. Charlee Morgan is Middays 10am-2pm, John Vosper is Afternoon Drive from 2pm-6pm, Carla Rider is Evening Show

Mark Patric is General Manager and Darren Metselaar is General Sales Manager

On June 28, 2013 at 10:00 am, the station adopted a classic hits format, and rebranded as 89.5 The Drive, beginning with a weekend-long countdown of 500 songs chosen by the listeners of the station.

On August 20, 2018, the Jim Pattison Group announced its intent to acquire Fabmar Communications pending CRTC approval.

On July 1, 2022, CHWK-FM flipped to country branded as 89.5 JR Country.

CHWK was the former call sign of a radio station in Chilliwack from 1927 until it changed its call sign to CKSR-FM in 2000.

Former Logo

References

 "The JIM Pattison Br Acquires Fabmar Communications To Expand Into Chilliwack, Whitecourt & Melfort" August 14, 2018

External links
89.5 JR Country

Hwk
Radio stations established in 2009
2009 establishments in British Columbia